Black Butterfly may refer to:

Film
 Black Butterfly (1968 film), a Hong Kong film directed by Lo Wei
 Black Butterfly (2006 film), a Peruvian film directed by Francisco Lombardi
 Black Butterfly (2013 film), 2013 Indian film directed by Rajaputra Ranjith
 Black Butterfly (2017 film), an American film directed by Brian Goodman

Music
 Black Butterfly (Dana Dawson album) 1995
 Black Butterfly (Tsakani Mhinga album) 2003
 Black Butterfly (Buckcherry album), a 2008 album by American hard rock band Buckcherry
 "Black Butterfly" (song), a 1984 song by American singer-songwriter Deniece Williams

Other
 Psychedelica of the Black Butterfly, a 2015 video game
 Black Butterfly (novel), a 2008 novel by Mark Gatiss